Besh-Jygach is a village in Jalal-Abad Region of Kyrgyzstan. It is part of Nooken District. Its population was 659 in 2021.

References

External links 
 Satellite map at Maplandia.com

Populated places in Jalal-Abad Region